Earnest Fields (born October 15, 1968 in Milan, Tennessee) is a former American football linebacker. He attended the University of Tennessee from 1988–1991. In 1990, he recorded 140 tackles for the season. As a senior, he was named the Volunteers' captain. In 1998 Fields played for the Nashville Kats of the Arena Football League.

External links
Profile at ArenaFan.com

1968 births
Living people
American football linebackers
Baltimore Stallions players
Tennessee Volunteers football players
Nashville Kats players
People from Milan, Tennessee